Hecphora testator is a species of beetle in the family Cerambycidae. It was described by Johan Christian Fabricius in 1781.

Subspecies
 Hecphora testator nitida Aurivillius, 1920
 Hecphora testator testator (Fabricius, 1781)

References

Astathini
Beetles described in 1781